Neil Hansen (born April 6, 1959) is an American politician who served as a member of the Utah House of Representatives from 1999 until 2011, representing the 9th district.

Early life and education 
Hansen was born on April 6, 1959, in Ogden, Utah. Hansen attended Ogden–Weber Technical College, Weber State University, and Davis Technical College, but did not earn a degree.

Career 
Prior to entering politics, Hansen worked in construction. He has worked as a Heavy Equipment Operator for the Ogden City Water Department since 1981.

Hansen was elected to the Utah House of Representatives in 1998. In the 2010 election, he was defeated Republican challenger Jeremy Peterson in 2010 by six percentage points. He challenged Peterson for his old seat in 2012, but lost by 20 percentage points. Hansen ran for Utah State Treasurer in 2016, but lost to incumbent David Damschen. Hansen ran for Governor of Utah in the 2020 election, but was eliminated in Utah Democratic Party convention.

Hansen was also a candidate for Mayor of Ogden, Utah, in 2003, 2007, and 2011, losing in the non-partisan primaries to incumbent Mayor Matthew Godfrey and Mike Caldwell.

Personal life 
Hansen and his wife, Debbie, have eight children. He is a member of the Church of Jesus Christ of Latter-day Saints.

References 

1959 births
Living people
Politicians from Ogden, Utah
Weber State University alumni
Democratic Party members of the Utah House of Representatives
Candidates in the 2020 United States elections